The High Capacity Metro Train (HCMT) is a type of electric multiple unit (EMU) train for use by Metro Trains Melbourne on the Melbourne rail network. The first train set entered service on 27 December 2020 and will become the primary rolling stock used in the Metro Tunnel when it opens in 2025. The HCMTs  carry around 1,400 passengers in seven carriages, running on Melbourne's  overhead catenary system, and are currently the most advanced trains in the Metro Trains fleet. A consortium of investors and rail companies are constructing the trains in China and Australia via a contract with the Victorian Government, in addition to upgrade works necessary for the operation of the trains.

History

Background 
The previous major procurement of rolling stock for the Melbourne rail network occurred in 2002, when franchisees M>Train and Connex ordered 62 Siemens Nexas and 58 X'Trapolis 100 trains respectively, as part of their franchise agreements to replace the older Hitachi trains. However, the Siemens units suffered major braking issues over the following decade, causing their repeated withdrawal from service; when the State Government tendered for 18 further six-carriage trains in 2007, it restricted bids to the previous two models ordered and awarded the contract to Alstom. Several further orders were placed for X'Trapolis trains over the next 10 years.

The Public Transport Development Authority (later branded as Public Transport Victoria) was created in 2011 by the newly-elected state government of Premier Ted Baillieu with the intent of, among other things, running major studies into the operation of the metropolitan rail network. The Network Development Plan Metropolitan Rail (NDPMR), released publicly in early 2013 in the partial fulfillment of this objective, was designed as a series of concrete proposals for the expansion and consolidation of the rail network over the following 20 years. The NDPMR's first stage, intended to be completed before 2016, acknowledged the need for an interim solution of several more X'Trapolis trains to overcome major constraints, as well as recommending the internal reconfiguration of Siemens and Comeng trains to increase capacity, but identified the provision of new rolling stock as critical to the cost-effective use of existing railway infrastructure.

Among the deficiencies of existing rolling stock noted by the NDPMR were "multi-purpose" designs intended to strike a balance between commuter rail and metro operations, and the failure of existing trains to use the entire length of metropolitan platforms. The NDPMR rejected double-decker trains on the basis that they would increase dwell time at crowded stations, and argued that 220 metre trains, formed by operating the existing three car sets as nine car trains, would require extensive and prohibitively expensive infrastructure works, particularly in the City Loop. The NDPMR envisaged these trains with a maximum capacity of 1,100 and 1,600 passengers respectively.

The NDPMR envisaged that these high-capacity trains would completely replace the Comeng fleet by 2032, and be used primarily on the Sunshine–Dandenong line created by the Metro Tunnel. Furthermore, it identified the need for the new trains to include cab signalling to reduce the headway required between trains, and for the construction of new maintenance facilities at several points on the network.

Prior to the 2014 Victorian election, then-Premier Denis Napthine promised an order of 25 of the proposed high-capacity trains if his incumbent Liberal-National Coalition government was returned for a second term.

Order and design phase 
In June 2015, the new Labor Victorian Government under Premier Daniel Andrews announced that expressions of interest would be requested for 37 new trains to be delivered and maintained for the Melbourne rail network.

In November 2015, three consortia were shortlisted to build and maintain 37 trains:
 Bombardier: Bombardier Transportation, Macquarie Bank, Itochu and Infrared Capital Partners
 Eureka Rail: Alstom, Bank of Tokyo-Mitsubishi UFJ and John Laing
 Evolution Rail: Downer Rail, CRRC Changchun Railway Vehicles and Plenary Group

In March 2016, the order was increased to 65.

In September 2016, the contract was awarded to the Evolution Rail consortium. New depots to maintain the trains will be built in Pakenham East and Calder Park. By September of the following year, a full-scale mock-up of two carriages had been constructed and was presented to Minister for Public Transport Jacinta Allan. The mock-up was made available to drivers, technicians, representatives of the Public Transport Users Association and passenger groups including the visually impaired and those with physical disabilities. The Evolution Rail consortium noted that this last stage in the design process marked the fulfilment of the project's first major contractual obligation.

 In late 2017, the Locomotive Division of the Victorian Rail Tram and Bus Union lodged proceedings in the Federal Court of Australia against Metro Trains, claiming that the consortium, government and Metro planned to introduce a lower standard of training for operators of the HCMT. It furthermore refused to support the implementation of the new rolling stock unless all electric train drivers were trained in the operation of the HCMT. Among the union's objections to the project are the necessary changes in work practice and the increased automation of certain processes. This followed criticism by the Australian Workers' Union of the decision to award the contract to Evolution Rail instead of Bombardier, the latter of which had an established manufacturing operation in Dandenong. The government announced the awarding of several subcontracts for the project in December.

The mockup carriages used for the consultation phase were placed on public display at Birrarung Marr from 9–17 February 2018. The display concluded during Melbourne's White Night event with a light show.

By June of that year, manufacturing had commenced, with the first body shells arriving at Newport Workshops from CRRC's facility in China.

The HCMTs were expected to begin testing in November 2018 and enter passenger service on the Cranbourne and Pakenham lines in 2019.  

The first revenue service for the HCMT was the 8:31am service from Pakenham on the Pakenham line on 27 December 2020. This was an extra service and regular timetabled services didn't commence until 31 January 2021, when the new PTV timetable was introduced.

On 9 May 2022 the Victorian Government announced it was procuring an additional 5 HCMT sets for use on the Melbourne Airport rail link, to bring the total order to 70.

Contract and construction 
The trains are being delivered as a public–private partnership (PPP) between the State of Victoria and Evolution Rail Pty Ltd, under the Partnerships Victoria agency. The initial contract specified that the consortium would be responsible for the design, construction and delivery of 65 trains, as well as the construction of a heavy maintenance facility and depot in Pakenham East, the construction of a light maintenance facility in Calder Park, and the provision of two simulators for driver training. It also stated that the consortium would be responsible for the maintenance of the HCMTs throughout their lifetime, as well as the operation and maintenance of the depots and simulators over the same time frame.

Evolution Rail is a consortium composed of CRRC Changchun Railway Vehicles, Downer Rail and Plenary Group.

CRRC Changchun is leading the development and design for the HCMTs, and is manufacturing the train bodies as a joint venture with Downer Rail. 60% of construction is "local content" from a Victorian manufacturing supply chain. Downer leads the delivery and maintenance of the sets, as well as the construction of the new rail yard facilities.  Frames for bogies will be manufactured by Hoffman Engineering in Bendigo. The Australian arm of Times Electric is manufacturing the traction motors and other electrical systems in Morwell, and SIGMA Air Conditioning is building the heating and cooling systems in Derrimut. Assembly of wheel sets and bogies is being performed by Downer at Newport Workshops.  Plenary Group is responsible for the financial management of the project, and the debt is financed by a group of investment banks led by Westpac.

The contract did not prescribe specific design elements of the HCMTs, but required that the design fulfil a number of objectives, centred on the provision of a "safe and comfortable journey for passengers".

The total value of the PPP is around $2.3 billion.

Design 
The HCMT are based on the Type A design used by CRRC Changchun. The trains will have seven carriages initially, with a total passenger capacity of 1,380. However, provision will be made for the trains to be extended to 10 carriages for a capacity of more than 1,970. An aerodynamic nose cone and retractable cover for the couplers at each end of the trains has been designed to reduce the incidence of train surfing when the HCMTs are in operation.

Approximately 30–40% of passengers will be seated when the train is at full capacity. The standing areas of the train will offer multiple types of straps and handles for the safety of standing passengers, and wide doors for rapid ingress and egress from these areas. As well as 70 passenger information displays (PIDs) in each train, Wi-Fi connection will be available throughout the passenger areas. The PIDs will show the next station, current time, and the train's location on an adapted rail map. Displays on the front and sides of the train will indicate its destination. Twenty-eight wheelchair spaces and wide aisles between seats will enable easy access for passengers with disabilities.

A number of semi-automated features will be implemented in the HCMT design, including the capacity for low-speed shunting by remote control and for trains to be started without the presence of a driver. The trains will also automatically estimate the passenger load, and the reading can be accessed remotely. Furthermore, the HCMTs will include "stopping aids" to maximize accuracy of the position of train's arrival at platforms. 
Drivers will also have the capacity to open individual doors on the trains.

References

Bibliography

External links 

Changchun Railway Vehicles
Electric multiple units of Victoria (Australia)
Melbourne rail rollingstock
Train-related introductions in 2020
CRRC multiple units
1500 V DC multiple units of Victoria